Klaus Meyer (5 August 1937 – 4 April 2014) was a German football player. He spent ten seasons with Eintracht Braunschweig, including five in the Bundesliga, starting with the league's foundation in 1963. In total, Meyer played 212 matches in all official competitions for Braunschweig, scoring three goals.

Meyer died on 4 April 2014.

Honours
 Bundesliga champion: 1966–67

References

External links
 

1937 births
2014 deaths
Sportspeople from Braunschweig
German footballers
Association football defenders
Eintracht Braunschweig players
Bundesliga players
Footballers from Lower Saxony